Bommasamudram is a village in Chittoor district, Andhra Pradesh. This village is also called 44 Bommasamudram.

Administration
Bommasamudram Panchayath
Gudipala mandal
Chittoor Dist -

Demographics
The total population of this village is around 1000.

References

Villages in Chittoor district